Kévin Beauverger (born 16 December 1993) is a French footballer who plays as a defender. He played for Ligue 1 club Stade Rennais.

Club career 

Kévin Beauverger is a youth exponent from Stade Rennais. He made his Ligue 1 debut on 11 May 2013 against Valenciennes F.C. He was subbed on at the 61st minute.

References 

1993 births
Living people
French footballers
Association football defenders
Ligue 1 players
Stade Rennais F.C. players